Dominic Mancini was an Italian monk who visited England in 1482–3. He witnessed the events leading up to Richard III being offered the English crown. He left in 1483 and wrote a report of what he had witnessed. He called it: De Occupatione Regni Anglie per Riccardum Tercium ('The Occupation of the Throne of England by Richard III'). The account is a major source of information about the period, but it sat unread in a French library in Lille until rediscovered in 1934.

Mancini's report was written for Angelo Cato, Archbishop of Vienne, one of the counsellors of King Louis XI of France and also his doctor and astrologer. Although some historians think Mancini arrived in England at the end of 1482, others believe he got there just before Edward IV died (9 April 1483). He returned to France sometime between the coronation of Richard III on 6 July 1483 – before the princes disappeared – and the delivery of his report in December the same year.

It is not clear how much English Mancini understood, and much of what was happening in England while he was there had to be translated for him. A possible source was Dr John Argentine, an opponent of Richard who became a member of Henry VII's court and who spoke Italian. Argentine was the doctor who was treating the elder prince, Edward V, while he was in the Tower and is one of the last persons known to have seen the two princes alive.

Mancini's report was lost for centuries but was discovered in the Municipal Library in Lille, France, in 1934. As far as is known, Mancini never met King Richard, but he repeated the gossip and rumours that were current about the activities of the royal family; these included the "suspicion" that Richard's nephews had been done away with. Guillaume de Rochefort, Lord Chancellor of France, repeated the rumour in the Estates-General in Tours in January 1484, adding that Richard III had "massacred" the princes and then been given the crown "by the will of the people"; he may have obtained his information from Mancini's report. The French used this intelligence as an excuse for assisting Henry's invasion.

Works
 Mancini, Dominic, The Usurpation of Richard the Third, (C.A.J. Armstrong, translator), Sutton Publishing (1984) 
 Mancini, Dominic. Domenico Mancini de occupatione regni Anglie,  (Introduction, historical notes and translated by Annette Carson), Imprimis Imprimatur (2021) ISBN 978-0-9576840-6-5

Notes

References
Charles Ross, Richard III, University of California Press, Berkeley, CA (1981) 
Alison Weir, The Princes in the Tower, Ballantine (1993) 

15th-century Italian Christian monks
15th century in England
Year of birth unknown
Year of death unknown
Richard III of England
Italian expatriates in England
Italian memoirists